OpenBGPD, also known as OpenBSD Border Gateway Protocol Daemon, is a server software program that allows general purpose computers to be used as routers. It is a Unix system daemon that provides a free, open-source implementation of the Border Gateway Protocol version 4. This allows a machine to exchange routes with other systems that speak BGP.

OpenBSD Border Gateway Protocol Daemon is developed by Henning Brauer, Peter Hessler, and Claudio Jeker as part of the OpenBSD project. OpenOSPFD, developed by Esben Nørby, is a companion daemon of OpenBGPD that implements the Open Shortest Path First protocol.  The suite was developed as an alternative to packages such as Quagga, a Linux-focused routing suite which is licensed under the GPL and does not meet the project's requirements and quality standards.

Goals 
The design goals of OpenBSD Border Gateway Protocol Daemon include being secure (non-exploitable), reliable, and lean enough for most users, both in size and memory usage. The configuration language should be both powerful and easy to use. It must also be able to quickly handle hundreds of thousands of table entries in a memory-efficient way.

Design 
OpenBGPD consists of a parent process, and two child processes: the Route Decision Engine (RDE), and the Session Engine (SE). The parent process is the only part that doesn't drop privileges; the others do, in the interest of non-exploitability. The parent process cannot drop privileges, because it needs to update the routing table and it has to run on a privileged port (179).

See also

List of open source routing platforms

References

External links 
 
 
 A paper explaining OpenBGPD by Henning Brauer
 Hasso Tepper's work on OpenBGPD on Debian GNU/Linux
 Routing with OpenBSD using OpenOSPFD and OpenBGPD - Paper (pdf) by Claudio Jeker (2006)

BSD software
BGPD
Free routing software
OpenBSD software using the ISC license